General Gerard Van Caelenberge is a Belgium Air Force general, he was Air Component Commander in 2006 to 2008 and Chief of Defence of the Kingdom of Belgium in March 2012 until retired in July 2016. He was an expertise and member of the NATO Cooperative Cyber Defence Centre of Excellence.

Van Caelenberge was born September 6, 1952 in Antwerp, he attended Collège Saint Michel Brasschaat and graduated from the Royal Cadets School Lier in 1970. He enrolled in the Royal Military Academy as student pilot of the polytechnic division graduated in 1975, he was trained on the Marchetti SF-260, Fouga Magister and T-33 in Brustem. He went on to obtained his pilots wings in 1977 and was trained on F-104G Startfighter. He was assigned to 350th Squadron of 1st Fighter Wing Beauvechain and attends a conversion of F-16 specific in electronic warfare.

He also attends the Royal Defence College for staff course 1984 and was back to the 350th Squadron. He was later assigned to AirForce Staff operations section in charge of Air Defence in 1985 and later went on to the Royal Defence College to complete his Senior Staff Course in 1987 and after completing he was the commander of the F-16 350th Squadron. He also commanded the Flying Group of the 1st Fighter Wing in Beauvechain base in 1995 and after attending a training, he was the instructor on Alpha-jet and Marchetti SF-260 in 1996 before he became the commander of Beauvechain airbase and the Flying Group Commander of the Centralised Flying Schools.

He also went to the NATO Defence College Rome for a senior course in 1997, he commanded the 10th Tactical Wing in Kleine Brogel Base in 2001/2002 before he was moved to Defence Staff Operations and Training Department in 2004 and there after he was Deputy Operations Commander in 2005.

He became Aide-de-Camp to the King in 2005 to 2006 were he later made the Air Component Commander to 2008 and was also the Director of the European Air Group. He did serves as Assistant Chief of Staff Operations and Training in 2009 to 2011 and rose to the rank of Air Chief Marshall (air general) before he was made the interim Chief of Defence in 2012 and continued until he retired in July 2016.

Awards 

  Commander, Order of Leopold
  Order of the Crown
  Commander, Order of Leopold II
  First Class, Military Cross
  Commemorative Medal for Foreign Operations or Missions
  Meritorious Service Medal
  NATO Medal

Personal life 
Van Caelenberge is married to Anne Van den Berghe with two children.

References

External links 

 
 
 

Living people
Belgian generals
Belgian military personnel
1952 births